Albert Holt (born 1936), usually referred to as Uncle Albert Holt, is an Aboriginal elder of the Bidjara people.

Early life
Holt was born in 1936 on the Barambah Mission Reserve (now known as Cherbourg) after his family was forcibly removed from their home country near Springsure.  His father was from the Bidjara nation while his mother was from the Yiman and Wakaman nations.

Career
Throughout his life, Holt has worked as an advocate for community justice, as well as for better education and health services for Australian First Nations people.   He has contributed to many advisory committees, parliamentary reviews, ministerial policy forums and educational working groups.

For two decades, Holt advocated for schools in Queensland to be more inclusive and lobbied them to incorporate Aboriginal history into their curriculum, while also encouraging students to maximise the educational opportunities which are available to them. Holt continues to regularly visit many schools to speak to students about Aboriginal culture and to promote reconciliation. As of 2019, Uncle Albert had been adopted by over eight local schools.

Holt founded the Hymba Yumba Community Hub, an independent indigenous school built at Springfield in 2011.

In 1995, Holt became the first senior liaison officer to work at the Queensland Police Service.

At the end of 2001, Holt retired from full time work. However, he continued to be heavily involved in the community.

In 2006, Holt helped establish the Murri Court in Queensland, where magistrates are advised on sensitive cultural issues. He also became a member of the ministerial-appointed Queensland Indigenous Consultative Committee where he was invited to advise the government on issues concerning education for Aboriginal and Torres Strait Islander students.

He is also credited with helping establish the Inala Indigenous Health Service and the Southern Queensland Centre of Excellence in Aboriginal and Torres 
Strait Islander Primary Health Care. Holt is also one of the founders of the Inala Family Education Centre.

Books
Holt released his autobiography entitled Forcibly Removed in 2001, which was followed by Murri on a Mission - Gunnan Gunnan in 2015.

In 2017, Holt, Everald Compton and Henry Palaszczuk all contributed to Sophie Church's book Goondeen: Understanding Australia where they each discussed their personal stories and their views about what type of country they believe Australia is.

Recognition
A community housing development in Inala was named Uncle Albert Holt Terraces.

Holt was named as the Male Elder of the Year at the 2005 NAIDOC Awards and received the Premier's Senior Citizen Volunteer Award in 2007.

In 2018, Holt received an honorary doctorate from the World Indigenous Nations University, while a building at the Hymba Yumba Community Hub was named in his honour.

In October 2017, Queensland premier Annastacia Palaszczuk announced Holt had been selected as a baton bearer for the Queen's Baton Relay, held prior to the 2018 Commonwealth Games on the Gold Coast.

In 2022, Holt was named as a Queensland Great.

References

1936 births
Australian Aboriginal elders
Queensland Greats
Living people